.lt is the Internet country code top-level domain (ccTLD) for Lithuania.

In 1992 on June 3, with the help of the Norwegian government, the .lt top-level domain was established on the Internet at the request of the University of Oslo. Not long after, the establishment of the top-level .lt domain in 1993. The first second-level domains mii.lt, ktu.lt, vu.lt were registered. At that time, only the academic community, state institutions and companies could have Internet addresses. In 1994 domain administration from Oslo University was transferred to Kaunas University of Technology.

References

External links
 IANA .lt whois information
 .lt domain registration website

Country code top-level domains
Internet in Lithuania
Council of European National Top Level Domain Registries members

sv:Toppdomän#L